Oscar Moreno may refer to:
Oscar Moreno (politician) (born 1951), current Filipino mayor of Cagayan de Oro
Oscar Moreno (actor) (1921–2003), Filipino actor in several Philippine films of the 1940s
Óscar Moreno (1878–1971), Portuguese urologist and chemist
Óscar Cano (born 1972), Spanish football manager (full name is Óscar Pedro Cano Moreno)
Oscar Moreno (rower) (fl. 1948), Argentine rower
Oscar Moreno Nuñez, Gibraltarian footballer, current captain of F.C. Boca Gibraltar